The headline or heading is the text indicating the content or nature of the article below it, typically by providing a form of brief summary of its contents.

The large type front page headline did not come into use until the late 19th century when increased competition between newspapers led to the use of attention-getting headlines.

It is sometimes termed a news hed, a deliberate misspelling that dates from production flow during hot type days, to notify the composing room that a written note from an editor concerned a headline and should not be set in type.

Headlines in English often use a set of grammatical rules known as  headlinese, designed to meet stringent space requirements by, for example, leaving out forms of the verb "to be" and choosing short verbs like "eye" over longer synonyms like "consider".

Production

A headline's purpose is to quickly and briefly draw attention to the story. It is generally written by a copy editor, but may also be written by the writer, the page layout designer, or other editors. The most important story on the front page above the fold may have a larger headline if the story is unusually important. The New York Times 21 July 1969 front page stated, for example, that "MEN WALK ON MOON", with the four words in gigantic size spread from the left to right edges of the page.

In the United States, headline contests are sponsored by the American Copy Editors Society, the National Federation of Press Women, and many state press associations; some contests consider created content already published, others are for works written with winning in mind.

Typology 
Research in 1980 classified newspaper headlines into four broad categories: questions, commands, statements, and explanations. Advertisers and marketers classify advertising headlines slightly differently into questions, commands, benefits, news/information, and provocation.

Research

A study indicates there has been a substantial increase of sentiment negativity and decrease of emotional neutrality in headlines across written popular U.S.-based news media since 2000.

Skilled newspaper readers "spend most of their reading time scanning the headlines—rather than reading [all or most of] the stories".

Headlines can bias readers toward a specific interpretation and readers struggle to update their memory in order to correct initial misconceptions in the cases of misleading or inappropriate headlines.

One approach investigated as a potential countermeasure to online misinformation is "attaching warnings to headlines of news stories that have been disputed by third-party fact-checkers", albeit its potential problems include e.g. that false headlines that fail to get tagged are considered validated by readers.

Criticism

Sensationalism, inaccuracy and misleading headlines

"Slam"

The use of "slam" in headlines has attracted criticism on the grounds that the word is overused and contributes to media sensationalism. The violent imagery of words like "slam", "blast", "rip", and "bash" has drawn comparison to professional wrestling, where the primary aim is to titillate audiences with a conflict-laden and largely predetermined narrative, rather than provide authentic coverage of spontaneous events.

Crash blossoms

"Crash blossoms" is a term used to describe headlines that have unintended ambiguous meanings, such as The Times headline "Hospitals named after sandwiches kill five". The word 'named' is typically used in headlines to mean "blamed/held accountable/named [in a lawsuit]", but in this example it seems to say that the hospitals' names were related to sandwiches. The headline was subsequently changed in the electronic version of the article to remove the ambiguity. The term was coined in August 2009 on the Testy Copy Editors web forum after the Japan Times published an article entitled "Violinist Linked to JAL Crash Blossoms" (since retitled to "Violinist shirks off her tragic image").

Headlinese

Headlinese is an abbreviated form of news writing style used in newspaper headlines. Because space is limited, headlines are written in a compressed telegraphic style, using special syntactic conventions, including:
 Forms of the verb "to be" and articles (a, an, the) are usually omitted.
 Most verbs are in the simple present tense, e.g. "Governor signs bill", while the future is expressed by an infinitive, with to followed by a verb, as in "Governor to sign bill"
 The conjunction "and" is often replaced by a comma, as in "Bush, Blair laugh off microphone mishap".
 Individuals are usually specified by surname only, with no honorifics.
 Organizations and institutions are often indicated by metonymy: "Wall Street" for the US financial sector, "Whitehall" for the UK government administration, "Madrid" for the government of Spain, "Davos" for World Economic Forum, and so on.
 Many abbreviations, including contractions and acronyms, are used: in the US, some examples are Dems (for "Democrats") and GOP (for the Republican Party, from the nickname "Grand Old Party"); in the UK, Lib Dems (for the Liberal Democrats), Tories (for the Conservative Party).  The period (full point) is usually omitted from these abbreviations, though U.S. may retain them, especially in all-caps headlines to avoid confusion with the word us.
 Lack of a terminating full stop (period) even if the headline forms a complete sentence.
 Use of single quotation marks to indicate a claim or allegation that cannot be presented as a fact. For example, an article titled "Ultra-processed foods 'linked to cancer covered a study which suggested a link but acknowledged that its findings were not definitive.  Linguist Geoffrey K. Pullum characterizes this practice as deceptive, noting that the single-quoted expressions in newspaper headlines are often not actual quotations, and sometimes convey a claim that is not supported by the text of the article. Another technique is to present the claim as a question, hence Betteridge's law of headlines.

Some periodicals have their own distinctive headline styles, such as Variety and its entertainment-jargon headlines, most famously "Sticks Nix Hick Pix".

Commonly used short words
To save space and attract attention, headlines often use extremely short words, many of which are not otherwise in common use, in unusual or idiosyncratic ways:

 ace (a professional, especially a member of an elite sports team, e.g. "England ace")
 axe (to eliminate)
 bid (to attempt)
 blast (to heavily criticize)
 cagers (basketball team – "cage" is an old term for indoor court)
 chop (to eliminate)
 coffer(s) (a person or entity’s financial holdings)
 confab (a meeting)
 eye (to consider)
 finger (to accuse, blame)
 fold (to shut down)
 gambit (an attempt)
 hike (to increase, raise)
 ink (to sign a contract)
 laud (to praise)
 lull (a pause)
 mar (to damage, harm)
 mull (to contemplate)
 nab (to grab)
 nix (to reject)
 parley (to discuss)
 pen (to write)
 probe (to investigate)
 rap (to criticize)
 romp (an easy victory or a sexual encounter)
 row (an argument or disagreement)
 rue (to lament)
 see (to forecast)
 slay (to murder)
 slam (to heavily criticize)
 snub (to reject)
 solon (to judge)
 spat (an argument or disagreement)
 tap (to select, choose)
 tot (a child)
 tout (to put forward)
 woe (disappointment or misfortune)

Famous examples 

Some famous headlines in periodicals include:
 WALL ST. LAYS AN EGG – Variety on Black Monday (1929)
 STICKS NIX HICK PIX – Variety writing that rural moviegoers preferred urban films (1935)
 DEWEY DEFEATS TRUMAN – Chicago Tribune reporting the wrong election winner (1948)
 FORD TO CITY: DROP DEAD – New York Daily News reporting the denial of a federal bailout for bankrupt New York City (1975)
 MUSH FROM THE WIMP – The Boston Globe in-house joke headline for an editorial, which was not changed before 161,000 copies had been printed. Theo Lippman Jr. of the Baltimore Sun declared "Mush from the Wimp" the second most famous newspaper headline of the 20th century, behind "Wall St. Lays an Egg" and ahead of "Ford to City: Drop Dead".
 HEADLESS BODY IN TOPLESS BAR – New York Post on a local murder (1983)
 SICK TRANSIT'S GLORIOUS MONDAY – New York Daily News front-page caption on a photo (1979) reporting an agreement to avoid fare increases and provide federal funding
 GOTCHA – The UK Sun on the torpedoing of the Argentine ship Belgrano and sinking of a gunboat during the Falklands War (1982)
 FREDDIE STARR ATE MY HAMSTER – The UK Sun (1986), claiming that the comedian had eaten a fan's pet hamster in a sandwich. The story was later proven false, but is seen as one of the classic tabloid newspaper headlines.
 GREAT SATAN SITS DOWN WITH THE AXIS OF EVIL – The Times (UK) on US-Iran talks (2007)
 UNDERWEAR BANDIT CAUGHT, ADMITS BRIEF CRIME SPREE – Kodiak Daily Mirror (Alaska, US) on the arrest of a panty-pilfering suspect who had admitted his short involvement in the crime. (2014)
 SUPER CALEY GO BALLISTIC CELTIC ARE ATROCIOUS – Sun on Inverness Caledonian Thistle beating Celtic F.C. in the Scottish Cup; a pun on "Supercalifragilisticexpialidocious"
 WE ARE POPE (in German: Wir sind Papst); Bild after a German was voted to become Pope Benedict XVI in 2005.

The New Republic editor Michael Kinsley began a contest to find the most boring newspaper headline. According to him, no entry surpassed the one that had inspired him to create the contest: "WORTHWHILE CANADIAN INITIATIVE", over a column by The New York Times Flora Lewis. In 2003, New York Magazine published a list of eleven "greatest tabloid headlines".

See also 
 A-1 Headline, a 2004 Hong Kong film
 
 Bus plunge, a type of news story, and accompanying headline
 Copy editing
 Corporate jargon
 Crosswordese, words common in crosswords that are otherwise rarely used
 
 Ellipsis (linguistics), omission of words
 Headlines (from The Tonight Show with Jay Leno)
 Lead paragraph
 
 Syntactic ambiguity, leads to multiple humorous possible alternative interpretations of written headline

References

Further reading 
 Harold Evans (1974). News Headlines (Editing and Design : Book Three) Butterworth-Heinemann Ltd. 
 Fritz Spiegl (1966). What The Papers Didn't Mean to Say. Scouse Press, Liverpool 
 Mårdh, Ingrid (1980); Headlinese: On the Grammar of English Front Page headlines; "Lund studies in English" series; Lund, Sweden: Liberläromedel/Gleerup; 
 Biber, D. (2007); "Compressed noun phrase structures in newspaper discourse: The competing demands of popularization vs. economy"; in W. Teubert and R. Krishnamurthy (eds.); Corpus linguistics: Critical concepts in linguistics; vol. V, pp. 130–141; London: Routledge

External links 

 Front Page – The British Library Exhibition of famous newspaper headlines

 
Journalism terminology